The Unity World Cup is an international football competition contested by Christian national men's teams.
Its name, unity, shows its will to unite the different Christians during a sports event.
It is organized with the help of the John Paul II Foundation for sports.

Its inaugural tournament took place in Goa, Hyderabad and Bangalore (India) in 2014 and involved eight national teams.
The second edition took place in Bogota (Colombia) in 2016, with ten teams involved.
The next competition will be played in Egypt in 2018.

First edition: Goa 2014 

Eight nations participated.

Teams 
Group A
 
 
 
 
Group B
 
 
 
 
The Nigerian team won the tournament.

Second edition: Bogota 2016

Teams 
Group A
 
 
 
 
 
Group B
 
 
 
 
 
Brazil won the tournament.

References

Christianity and sports
Non-FIFA football competitions